Episode is the debut studio album of Filipino singer-songwriter Zack Tabudlo. It was released on October 15, 2021, under Island Records Philippines and distributed by MCA Music.

The album features 14 tracks, including the hit single "Binibini" which broke a record as the top local song on Spotify's Philippines charts. The album has been highly acclaimed by music critics.

Recording
Prior to the release, Tabudlo had been writing and producing his own tracks for the album based on "many emotions" about life, love and heartbreaks.

Promotion
Before the release of his album, Tabudlo released a series of music videos for all of its tracks in the form of "episodes" or "stories" that were uploaded on his official YouTube channel. It features celebrities such as Andrea Brillantes, Seth Fedelin, Paulo Avelino, Charlie Dizon, Cong TV and Viy Cortez of Team Payaman, James Reid, and others.

The album's artwork was designed by designer-illustrator John Ed De Vera.

He would later promote the album through his digital online concert on December 23, 2021.

Track listing
Note: all tracks are written and produced by Tabudlo.

References

2021 debut albums
Tagalog-language albums
Island Records albums
Universal Music Group albums